Never Say Never is the third single from the album Together Forever, released by the hip-hop and Freestyle music singer Lisette Melendez in 1991. The song was written by Carlos Berrios and Franc Reyes. Unlike the previous singles, this was released only on cassette and LP 12" only clubs, where he achieved moderate success in stop dance music of the United States, peaking at # 45 in 1992.

Tracks
 12" single

 12 "Single (Promo)

Chart positions

References

1991 singles
Lisette Melendez songs
1991 songs